Kronokotherium is an extinct herbivorous marine mammal of the family Desmostylidae in the order Desmostylia.

Its type locality is Raktinskaya, Kamchatka Peninsula, Russia (paleocoordinates ).

Kronokotherium was made a separate genus because the specimen differs from Desmostylus in the arrangement of the major molar cusps and its smaller size, but it has been synonymized with Desmostylus by most authors.

Notes

References

 
 

Desmostylians
Miocene mammals of Asia
Prehistoric placental genera
Fossil taxa described in 1957
Extinct animals of Russia